Arctostaphylos densiflora,  known by the common name Vine Hill manzanita, is a very rare species of manzanita. It is endemic to Sonoma County, California, where it is known from only one extant population of 20 to 30 individual plants. These last wild members of the species are on land near Sebastopol which is owned and protected by the California Native Plant Society. In addition, there are five to ten plants of this manzanita taxon growing on private property about a mile away. The local habitat is mostly chaparral on sandy shale soils.

Description
Arctostaphylos densiflora is a small shrub growing in low, spreading clumps under one meter in height. The shiny green leaves are oval to widely lance-shaped and less than three centimeters long. It bears inflorescences of light to bright pink urn-shaped flowers. The fruit is a drupe about half a centimeter wide.

Species differentiation
A. densiflora likely appeared about 1.5 million years ago, although the Arctostaphylos genus itself arose in the Miocene era.

See also
California chaparral and woodlands

References

External links
Jepson Manual Treatment - Arctostaphylos densiflora
USDA Plants Profile: Arctostaphylos densiflora
Arctostaphylos densiflora - Photo gallery

densiflora
Endemic flora of California
Endemic flora of the San Francisco Bay Area
Natural history of the California chaparral and woodlands
Natural history of Sonoma County, California
Plants described in 1932
Garden plants of North America
Drought-tolerant plants